Double Dare may refer to:

Television
 Double Dare (1976 game show), a CBS game show hosted by Alex Trebek, 1976–1977
 Double Dare (franchise), a Nickelodeon game show, 1986–1993, revived in 2000 and 2018
 Double Dare (UK game show), a British version of the U.S. Nickelodeon game show, 1987–1992
 Double Dare (TV series), starring Billy Dee Williams and Ken Wahl, 1985
 Double Dare (play), a television play by Dennis Potter, 1976

Other entertainment
 Double Dare (album), 2016 album by Waterparks
 Double Dare (film), a 2004 film by Amanda Micheli
 Double Dare (video game), a based on the game show Double Dare, 1988, 1990
 "Double Dare", a song by rock band Bauhaus from their album In the Flat Field, 1980
 Doubledare, an alias of the Lev Gleason Publications and Image Comics superhero Daredevil